Dunilovsky is a rural locality (a settlement) in Zavrazhskoye Rural Settlement, Nikolsky District, Vologda Oblast, Russia. The population was 500 as of 2010. There are 13 streets.

Geography 
Dunilovsky is located 37 km southeast of Nikolsk (the district's administrative centre) by road. Dunilovo is the nearest rural locality.

References 

Rural localities in Nikolsky District, Vologda Oblast